Arminidae is a family of sea slugs, marine gastropod mollusks in the superfamily Arminoidea.

Taxonomy 
The family Arminidae is classified within the clade Cladobranchia, itself belonging to the clade Nudibranchia (according to the taxonomy of the Gastropoda by Bouchet & Rocroi, 2005).

This family has been renamed several times. It was originally named by d'Orbigny in 1841 as Diphyllidiidae, by H. Adams and A. Adams as Pleurophyllidiidae in 1854, by Bergh as Pleuroleuridae in 1874, by Verrill and Emerton as Heterodorididae in 1882, by P. Fischer as Dermatobranchidae in 1883 and as Atthilidae by Bergh in 1899.  The name Arminidae is now in prevailing usage.

Genera 
The type genus is Armina Rafinesque, 1814

Genera in the family Arminidae include:
 Armina Rafinesque, 1814
Dermatobranchus van Hasselt, 1824
Histiomena Mörch, 1860
 Heterodoris  Verrill & Emerton, 1882 . This is a genus, only known from a few specimens
 Heterodoris antipodes Willan, 1981 (Tasman Sea)
 Heterodoris ingolfiana (south of Iceland)
 Heterodoris robusta  Verrill & Emerton, 1882 (North Atlantic Ocean, Arctic Ocean)
Pleurophyllidiella Eliot, 1903
Pleurophyllidiopsis Tchang-Si, 1934
Sancara
Species brought into synonymy 
Camarga : synonym of Histiomena Mörch, 1860
Diphyllidia : synonym of Armina Rafinesque, 1814
Linguella Férussac, 1822: synonym of Armina Rafinesque, 1814
Pleuroleura : synonym of Dermatobranchus van Hasselt, 1824
Pleurophyllidia : synonym of Armina Rafinesque, 1814

References

Gary R. McDonald, University of California Santa Cruz; 29 July 2006, "Nudibranch Systematic Index", University of California Santa Cruz

 Vaught, K.C. (1989). A classification of the living Mollusca. American Malacologists: Melbourne, FL (USA). . XII, 195 pp

Further reading 
Two readings about Heterodoris:

External links